Zawierzbie may refer to the following places:
Zawierzbie, Lesser Poland Voivodeship (south Poland)
Zawierzbie, Subcarpathian Voivodeship (south-east Poland)
Zawierzbie, Świętokrzyskie Voivodeship (south-central Poland)